A sarinda or saranda is a North Indian stringed folk musical instrument similar to lutes or fiddles. It is played with a bow and has between ten and thirty strings. The bottom part of the front of its hollow wooden soundbox is covered with animal skin. It is played while sitting on the ground in a vertical orientation.

The Sarangi and Nepali sarangi are similar to the Saranda.

Several ethnic groups of India, e.g. Bauls of Bengal,  Punjabi people, the folk artists of Rajasthan, Assam and Tripura, use the sarinda in their traditional music and dance. It is the sole accompaniment for a soloist or group folk singer(s).

See also
Sarangi - a more common relative of the sarinda.
Sarangi (Nepali) - a simpler version of the sarangi, played in Nepal and Sikkim.

External links

Website of Delhi based Tripuris
Article about dhodro banam a relative of the sarinda
Sarinda entry in an instrument encyclopedia
Brief description of the sarinda
Article on Sikhnet

Indian musical instruments
Necked bowl lutes
Bowed instruments
Drumhead lutes